Rose Mary Salum has authored 9 books. She is the founder of the award winning bilingual magazine  Literal Magazine. She is also the founder of Literal Publishing, a bilingual publisher house. She has taught as a visiting professor at  Universidad de Iowa,  Rice University, and Saint Thomas University.She is a member of the  Academia Norteamericana de la Lengua Española. Her essays and fiction are included in an array of anthologies:  Diáspora (Vaso Roto, 2017),  Lados B, Narrativa de alto riesgo (Nitro Press, 2016), The Body Subject & Subjected (Sussex Academy Press, 2015), Stirred Ground: Non-Fiction Writing by Contemporary Latina and Latin American Women Authors (Hostos Review, 2015), Cruce de fronteras: Antología de escritores Iberoamericanos en Estados Unidos (SubUrbano, 2013), Poéticas de los (dis)locamientos (Dislocados, 2012), Raíces latinas, narradores y poetas inmigrantes (Vagón azul, 2012), America nuestra: antología de narrativa en español en Estados Unidos (Linkgua, 2011), Professions (MLA, 2009), among others. Her books have been translated to Italian, Bulgarian, Portuguese and English.

Books 
 Donde el río se toca (Sudaquia, 2022)
 Otras lunas (Libros del sargento, 2022) 
 Tres semillas de granada. Ensayos desde el inframundo (Vaso Roto, 2020)
 Una de ellas (Dislocados, 2020)   
 The Water That Rocks the Silence (Forthcoming)  
 El agua que mece el silencio (Vaso Roto, 2015) 
 Delta de las arenas, cuentos árabes, cuentos judíos (Literal Publishing, 2013) 
 Almalafa y Caligrafía, Literatura de origen árabe en América Latina (Hostos Review) 
 Spaces in Between  (2006)
 Entre los espacios (Tierra Firme, 2004)

Awards and recognition
 Florida Book Awards (2020, Bronze Medal)  
 Top Ten Houston Women (2018) 
 Premio Panamericano Carlos Montemayor (2017)   
 International Latino Book Award (2016) 
 Top 35 Latinos  
 International Latino Book Award (2014), 
 [Mujeres Destacadas Award (2014)  
 Author of the Year 2008 by the Hispanic Book Festival (2018),
 Classical Award by Saint Thomas University (2006),
 A Recognition by the Congress of the United States (2005) 
 A Runner up for the PEN America’s Nora Magid Award

External links
 Official Page
 Rose Mary Salum on Literal, Latin American Voices

References

Year of birth missing (living people)
Living people
American writers
American company founders
American women company founders
21st-century American women